Echo Peak is the one of the taller mountains in the Madison Range in the U.S. state of Montana. The summit is located in Lee Metcalf Wilderness within Gallatin and Beaverhead-Deerlodge National Forests.

References

Mountains of Madison County, Montana
Mountains of Montana